WXAC (91.3 FM) is a college radio station licensed to Reading, Pennsylvania, and serves the Reading area. It is owned and operated by Albright College. WXAC is the only local station that provides Spanish-language programming to Berks County, with about 50 hours per week hosted by volunteer DJs from the local community. The station broadcasts from the Berks Community Media Center.

See also 
 Albright College
 Campus radio

References

External links 
 

XAC
XAC
Albright College
Radio stations established in 1965